is a Japanese freestyle wrestler. She has won five FILA Wrestling World Championships and two Olympic Bronze medals in the 72 kg weight class.

She is sponsored by Japan Beverage Inc. and was nominated by the Japanese Olympic Committee's Special Athlete Campaign.

Her father is professional wrestler Animal Hamaguchi, who is known for his emotional displays during Kyoko's matches. Although Kyoko has long wanted to follow in her father's footsteps and enter the professional game, the lack of a stable women's circuit since the collapse of All Japan Women's Pro-Wrestling has kept her from doing so.

Profile 
She swam while in junior high school. At the age of fourteen, she decided that she wanted to be a female professional wrestler and trained in the Animal Hamaguchi's Wrestling Dojo.

She has won the Japan Championship every year from 1996 to 2006, and has won the World Championships five times. In both the 2004 Athens Olympics and the 2008 Beijing Olympics, she won a bronze medal in the 72 kg class. She was also a flag bearer for the Japanese team in the opening Olympic ceremonies in 2004.

Results 
1996 - win - Japan Championship (70 kg)
1997 - win - Japan Championship (70 kg)
1997 - win - World Championship (75 kg)
1998 - win - Japan Championship (75 kg)
1998 - win - World Championship (75 kg)
1998 - FILA's female wrestler of the year
1999 - win - Japan Championship (75 kg)
1999 - win - World Championship (75 kg)
2000 - win - Japan Championship (75 kg)
2001 - win - Japan Championship (75 kg)
2001 - win - East Asia Competition
2002 - win - Japan Championship (72 kg)
2002 - win - World Championship (72 kg)
2002 - win - Asian Games at Busan (72 kg)
2003 - win - Japan Championship (72 kg)
2003 - win - World Championship (72 kg)
2004 - 2nd - Testing Competition for Athens Olympics (72 kg)
2004 - 3rd - Athens Olympics (72 kg)
2004 - win - Japan Championship (72 kg)
2005 - 2nd - World Championship (72 kg)
2005 - win - Japan Championship (72 kg) (winning for 10 years), MVP
2006 - win - Japan Queen's Cup (72 kg)
2006 - 2nd - World Cup (72 kg)
2006 - 2nd - Asian Games (72 kg)
2007 - 2nd - Asia Championship (72 kg)
2008 - 2nd - Asia Championship (72 kg)
2008 - 3rd - Beijing Olympics (72 kg)

Awards 
Tokyo Sports
Wrestling Special Award (1998, 1999, 2002-2006)

References

External links
 bio on fila-wrestling.com
 

1978 births
People from Taitō
Living people
Japanese female sport wrestlers
Wrestlers at the 2004 Summer Olympics
Wrestlers at the 2008 Summer Olympics
Wrestlers at the 2012 Summer Olympics
Olympic wrestlers of Japan
Olympic bronze medalists for Japan
Sportspeople from Tokyo
Olympic medalists in wrestling
Asian Games medalists in wrestling
Wrestlers at the 2002 Asian Games
Wrestlers at the 2006 Asian Games
Wrestlers at the 2010 Asian Games
Wrestlers at the 2014 Asian Games
Medalists at the 2008 Summer Olympics
World Wrestling Championships medalists
Medalists at the 2004 Summer Olympics
Asian Games gold medalists for Japan
Asian Games silver medalists for Japan
Asian Games bronze medalists for Japan
Medalists at the 2002 Asian Games
Medalists at the 2006 Asian Games
Medalists at the 2010 Asian Games
21st-century Japanese women